The Ebury Way is a  rail trail in Hertfordshire between Watford and Rickmansworth. The route crosses the Grand Union Canal and three rivers; the River Colne, the River Chess and the River Gade.

Passing lakes and fields in Rickmansworth, the path is shared by walkers and cyclists. Its origin as the Watford and Rickmansworth Railway means that it is wide and largely flat. It forms part of National Cycle Route 61 which runs between Windsor to the southwest and Ware to the northeast. The Watford section of the Ebury Way up to its crossing of the Colne also forms part of NCR 6 so this section is jointly routed 6/61.

See also
National Cycle Network
Segregated cycle facilities
List of rail trails
Sustainable transport

External links
Groundwork Herts
Ebury Way Cycling Leaflet
Sustrans

Cycleways in England
Footpaths in Hertfordshire
Tourist attractions in Hertfordshire
Rail trails in England
Watford
Rickmansworth